Proboštov is a municipality and village in Teplice District in the Ústí nad Labem Region of the Czech Republic. It has about 2,700 inhabitants.

Administrative parts
The village of Přítkov is an administrative part of Proboštov.

Notable people
Roman Postl (1969–2008), spree killer

References

External links

 

Villages in Teplice District